Raquel Atawo (née Kops-Jones; born December 8, 1982) is an American former professional tennis player, who is currently the head woman's tennis coach for the Washington State Cougars.

She is primarily a doubles specialist, winning 18 WTA doubles titles, including two Premier-5 titles at the 2012 Toray Pan Pacific Open and the 2014 Cincinnati Masters, and reaching the semifinals of the 2014 Australian Open, 2015 Wimbledon Championships and 2016 Wimbledon Championships, all alongside her regular partner, fellow American Abigail Spears.

Before serving as the head coach at Washington State, Atawo was an assistant women's tennis coach for Auburn University and a volunteer coach for University of California women's tennis.

Biography
Raquel's mother is Nancy Kops, and her father is Lawrence Jones. She has two sisters, Renee and Khristy. She married Toby Atawo on July 18, 2015.

Career
Her best results in doubles at Grand Slam events have been reaching the semifinals at the Australian Open in 2014 and Wimbledon in 2015 and 2016, both while partnered with Abigail Spears. Kops-Jones has a career-high doubles ranking of No. 10, achieved on March 2, 2015. She has won 18 WTA doubles titles.

In 2008, she played for the Boston Lobsters, and in 2019, played for the Philadelphia Freedoms—both teams in the World TeamTennis Pro League.

2012
Kops-Jones and compatriot Abigail Spears were one of the most successful doubles teams of the 2012 season, winning four titles, at Carlsbad, Seoul, Tokyo, and Osaka. The pair also reached two other finals and the quarterfinals of Wimbledon.

Significant finals

Premier Mandatory/Premier 5 finals

Doubles: 3 (2 titles, 1 runner-up)

WTA career finals

Doubles: 18 titles, 8 runner-ups

Doubles performance timeline

References

External links
 
 

African-American female tennis players
American female tennis players
Sportspeople from Fresno, California
Tennis people from California
1982 births
Living people
California Golden Bears women's tennis players
21st-century African-American sportspeople
21st-century African-American women
20th-century African-American people
20th-century African-American women